Unley is a single-member electoral district for the South Australian House of Assembly. Named after the suburb of the same name, it is the state's smallest electorate by area at just . It is a suburban electorate in Adelaide's inner south, taking in the suburbs of Eastwood, Frewville, Fullarton, Glenside, Glenunga, Goodwood, Highgate, Hyde Park, Kings Park, Malvern, Myrtle Bank, Parkside, Unley, Unley Park and Wayville, as well as parts of Glen Osmond and Millswood.

Unley was created as a conservative seat. It was first contested at the 1938 election, where it was held by conservatives until the 1962 election, when Gil Langley captured the seat for Labor. Unley was one of the seats that put Labor in government at the 1965 election after decades of the Playmander in opposition, with Labor managing to retain Unley in the close 1968 and 1975 elections and the 1979 election loss. Langley was succeeded by Labor's Kym Mayes at the 1982 election, a state government minister. In the close 1989 election Labor again managed to retain Unley. However, Mayes was heavily defeated at the 1993 election landslide by Liberal Mark Brindal on a swing of over 12 percent, on paper turning Unley from marginal Labor to safe Liberal at one stroke. Brindal went on to serve as a minister in the government of John Olsen.

The electoral redistribution ahead of the 2002 election had a large effect on Unley, which lost several suburbs west of Goodwood Road while gaining several suburbs east of Fullarton Road, changing Unley from a marginal seat to a fairly safe to safe Liberal seat. This helped Brindal retain Unley with only a small swing against him as the Liberals lost government.

Brindal relinquished preselection of Unley prior to the 2006 election, contesting instead the electoral district of Adelaide held by the then Minister for Education, Jane Lomax-Smith. Despite a statewide Labor landslide, David Pisoni narrowly won with a 51 percent two-party vote despite a challenge from City of Unley mayor and Labor candidate Michael Keenan. It has since reverted to a fairly safe to safe Liberal seat.

Members for Unley

Election results

Notes

References
 ECSA profile for Unley: 2018
 ABC profile for Unley: 2018
 Poll Bludger profile for Unley: 2018

1938 establishments in Australia
Electoral districts of South Australia